The RM series is a model range of two-stroke motorcycles manufactured by Suzuki.  The letters "RM" stand for "Racing Model" and the motorcycles produced with this prefix in their model names are suited to use in motocross racing.  The first in the range was introduced in 1975 with the RM 125M, This bike was plagued by mechanical issues (nearly all seized) and a half year model, the RM "S" was rushed out along with a kit of the "S" changes for M owners. the M model is now rare as most were converted to S specs. (ported barrel, bigger carb and different CDI) these were the last of the down pipe RM's and were followed by the RM 125A, RM 250A, and RM 370A in 1976.  Preceding the RM lineup was the TM series, which included the TM 75, TM 100, TM 125, TM 250, and TM 400.  Motorcycles within the RM series continue to be manufactured today, the famous RM125 was discontinued in America in late 2008 . The 100 cc Rm100 was discontinued in 2005.  The Rm250 was discontinued by the 2008 model year.  This may possibly be related to changed class structure.  From 1999 to 2004, changes to the RM250 made 15 more stock horsepower, and a lower seat height.

The Rm125
The Suzuki rm125 & rm250 began production in 1975 and continued until 2008. The rm125 & rm250 was discontinued due to the decrease in demand for 2 stroke motocross bikes. The 2007 model had an approximate output of 33 wheel horsepower (28 kW)  at 11,250 rpm, and 24.7 nm of torque at 10,500 rpm.

Models
The models are:
 RM50
 RM60
 RM65
 RM80
 RM85
 RM100
 RM125
 RM250  
 RM370
 RM400
 RM465
 RM500

References

RM series
Two-stroke motorcycles